The Pennsylvania State Game Lands Number 42 are Pennsylvania State Game Lands in Cambria, Somerset and Westmoreland Counties in Pennsylvania in the United States providing hunting, bird watching, and other activities.

Geography
State Game Lands Number 42 is located in Jackson, Lower Yoder, Upper Yoder and West Taylor Townships in Cambria County, in Conemaugh and Jenner Townships in Somerset County, and in Fairfield, Ligonier and St Clair Townships in Westmoreland County.

Statistics

References

042
Protected areas of Cambria County, Pennsylvania
Protected areas of Somerset County, Pennsylvania
Protected areas of Westmoreland County, Pennsylvania